A corncob, also called corn cob, cob of corn or corn on the cob, is the central core of an ear of corn (also known as maize). It is the part of the ear on which the kernels grow. The ear is also considered a "cob" or "pole" but it is not fully a "pole" until the ear is shucked, or removed from the plant material around the ear.

Young ears, also called baby corn, can be consumed raw, but as the plant matures the cob becomes tougher until only the kernels are truly edible. However, during several instances of famine, especially in the European countries through the history, people have been known to eat the corncobs, especially the foamy middle part. The whole cob or just the middle used to be ground and mixed with whatever type of flour that was at hand (usually wheat or corn flour). It served as a sort of a peculiar "filler", to extend the quantity of the original flour and as such, it was used even in production of bread. 

Containing mainly cellulose, hemicellulose and lignin, corncob is not toxic to humans and can be digested, but the outside is rough and practically inedible in its original form, while the foamy part has a peculiar texture when mature and is completely bland, which most people would find unappealing, due to the consistency similar to foam plastic.

Corncobs are particularly good source of heat when burned, so they were traditionally used for roasting meat on the spit, barbecuing and heating the bread ovens, through the centuries. In the olden days, it was especially appreciated for its long and steady burning embers, also used for the ember irons.

When harvesting corn, the corncob may be collected as part of the ear (necessary for corn on the cob), or instead may be left as part of the corn stover in the field.

Uses 

Corncobs find use in the following applications:
 Industrial source of the chemical furfural
 Fiber in fodder for ruminant livestock (despite low nutritional value) 
Other applications include:
 Bedding for animals — cobs absorb moisture and provide a compliant surface
 Ground up and washed (then re-dried) to make cat litter
 A mild abrasive for cleaning building surfaces, when coarsely ground
 Raw material for bowls of corncob pipes
 As a biofuel
 Charcoal production
 Environmentally-friendly rodenticide (powdered corn cob)
 Soil conditioner, water retainer in horticulture
 Absorbent media for safe disposal of liquid and solid effluents
 Diluent/carrier/filler material in animal health products, agro-chemicals, veterinary formulations, vitamin premixes, pharmaceuticals, etc.
 Xylose — a sweetener
 Anal hygiene

References

External links 
 Making charcoal from corncobs

Maize